Chaenomeles speciosa, the flowering quince, Chinese quince, or Japanese quince (in the context of traditional Chinese medicine known as zhou pi mugua), is a thorny deciduous or semi-evergreen shrub native to eastern Asia. The flowers are usually red, but may be white or pink. The fruit is a fragrant but hard pome that resembles a quince.

Cultivation
This plant is widely cultivated in temperate regions for its twining habit and its showy flowers which appear early in the season, occasionally even in midwinter. It is frequently used as an informal low hedge. Numerous cultivars with flowers in shades of white, pink and red have been selected. The following cultivars and hybrids have gained the Royal Horticultural Society's Award of Garden Merit: 

The following cultivars have received the Royal Horticultural Society's Award of Garden Merit:
'Geisha Girl' (salmon pink)
'Moerloosei' (scarlet)
'Pink Lady' (pink)

See also
 Pseudocydonia (C. sinensis), also called mugua and Chinese quince; also extensively used in traditional Chinese medicine
 Papaya, a tropical fruit that shares the name mugua
 Scutellaria baicalensis, Huáng qín another traditional Chinese herb

References

External links

 USDA PLANTS
 Plants for a Future

speciosa
Dopamine reuptake inhibitors